Maximiliano Nicolás Ferreira (born 10 January 1989) is an Argentine professional footballer who plays as a midfielder for Defensores de Belgrano.

Career
Ferreira's career started in River Plate's academy, staying for ten years until sealing a move to Torneo Argentino C's Estudiantes. Ferreira joined San Telmo in 2011, which preceded a return to Estudiantes in 2012. Ferreira completed a move to Primera C Metropolitana's UAI Urquiza in 2012. He scored one goal in twenty matches in his first campaign, which ended with the title and subsequent promotion to tier three. Goals against Comunicaciones, Flandria, Barracas Central and Deportivo Morón followed in 2013–14. Ferreira was loaned to Platense in January 2015, remaining for twelve months and scoring once in twenty-six fixtures.

He returned to UAI Urquiza for 2016, prior to departing two years later. On 19 June 2018, after participating in one hundred and thirty-eight games and netting five goals for UAI Urquiza, Ferreira joined Primera B Nacional side Brown. His professional debut for the club arrived on 23 September during a goalless draw with Los Andes.

Career statistics
.

Honours
UAI Urquiza
Primera C Metropolitana: 2012–13

References

External links

1989 births
Living people
Sportspeople from Buenos Aires Province
Argentine footballers
Association football midfielders
Torneo Argentino C players
Primera B Metropolitana players
Primera C Metropolitana players
Primera Nacional players
Estudiantes de Olavarría footballers
San Telmo footballers
UAI Urquiza players
Club Atlético Platense footballers
Club Atlético Brown footballers
Defensores de Belgrano footballers